S. concolor  may refer to:
 Salanoia concolor, the brown-tailed mongoose, Malagasy brown-tailed mongoose or salano, a mammal species endemic to Madagascar
 Schippia concolor, the mountain pimento or Silver pimeto, a medium-sized palm species native to Belize and Guatemala
 Simias concolor, the pig-tailed langur, a large Old World monkey species found only on the Mentawai Islands in Indonesia

See also
 Concolor